Androsterone glucuronide (ADT-G) is a major circulating and urinary metabolite of testosterone and dihydrotestosterone (DHT). It accounts for 93% of total androgen glucuronides in women. ADT-G is formed from androsterone by UDP-glucuronosyltransferases, with the major enzymes being UGT2B15 and UGT2B17. It is a marker of acne in women while androstanediol glucuronide is a marker of hirsutism (excess hair growth) in women.

See also
 3α-Androstanediol
 Androsterone sulfate
 Etiocholanolone glucuronide

References

External links
 Metabocard for Androsterone Glucuronide (HMDB02829) – Human Metabolome Database

5α-Reduced steroid metabolites
Androstanes
Glucuronide esters
Human metabolites